Mara Corday (born Marilyn Joan Watts; January 3, 1930) is an American showgirl, model, actress, Playboy Playmate, and 1950s cult figure.

Early life
Corday was born in Santa Monica, California. Wanting a career in films, she came to Hollywood while still in her teens and found work as a showgirl at the Earl Carroll Theatre on Sunset Boulevard. Her physical beauty brought jobs as a photographer's model that led to a bit part as a showgirl in the 1951 film Two Tickets to Broadway.

Dancing
One of Corday's first professional jobs was as a dancer in the Earl Carroll Revue in Hollywood. Accompanied by her mother, Corday auditioned when she was 15 years old. During the 2½ years that she was in the show, she advanced "from showgirl to actress in the sketches". This was also when she adopted the stage name Mara Corday, because it made her seem more exotic. The name Mara came from a bongo player who called her Marita when Corday was working as an usher at the Mayan Theater; the name Corday was lifted from a bottle of perfume.

Film
Corday signed with Universal-International Pictures (UI) as a contract player, where she was given small roles in various B-movies and television series. In 1954, while on the set of Playgirl, she met actor and future husband Richard Long.

Her acting roles were small until 1955, when she was cast opposite John Agar and Leo G. Carroll in the successful science-fiction film Tarantula, which has Clint Eastwood in a very brief role as a jet fighter pilot. She had two other co-starring roles in the genre, The Black Scorpion and The Giant Claw (both 1957), as well as in a number of Western films, including Man Without a Star and Raw Edge. Film critic Leonard Maltin said Corday had "more acting ability than she was permitted to exhibit".

A few years after her husband's death in 1974, Corday's old friend Eastwood offered her a chance to return to films with a role in his 1977 film The Gauntlet. She also had a brief but significant role in Sudden Impact (1983), where she played the waitress who dumped sugar into the coffee of Det. Harry Callahan in that film's iconic "Go ahead, make my day" sequence. She acted with Eastwood again in his 1989 film Pink Cadillac, as well as in her last film, 1990's The Rookie.

Modeling
Corday appeared as a pinup girl in numerous men's magazines during the 1950s and was the Playmate of the October 1958 issue of Playboy, along with model Pat Sheehan.

Television
In 1956, Corday had a recurring role in the ABC television series Combat Sergeant. From 1959 to early 1961, Corday worked exclusively doing guest spots on various television series, such as Peter Gunn in the episode, “Keep Smiling”. 
She also guest starred with Steve McQueen in Wanted: Dead or Alive in April 1960.

Personal life
Following the 1955 death of Suzan Ball, the first wife of actor Richard Long, Corday began dating Long, and they married in 1957. Through Long's sister Barbara, Corday was a sister-in-law of actor Marshall Thompson. In the early 1960s, Corday gave up her career to devote herself to raising a family. Widowed in 1974, she had three children with Long during their 17-year marriage: Valerie, Carey, and Gregory.  Corday has also been a lifelong friend of actor Clint Eastwood, whom she met while working for Universal Pictures.

Partial filmography

 Two Tickets to Broadway (1951) - Showgirl / Passerby on Sidewalk (uncredited)
 Sea Tiger (1952) - Lola, Hotel Proprietress
 Son of Ali Baba (1952) - Girl on Balcony (uncredited)
 Toughest Man in Arizona (1952) - Bit Role (uncredited)
 The Lady Wants Mink (1953) - Model
 Problem Girls (1953) - Dorothy Childers
 Tarzan and the She-Devil (1953) - Locopo Woman (uncredited)
 Sweethearts on Parade (1953) - Belle
 Money from Home (1953) - Waitress (uncredited)
 Yankee Pasha (1954) - Harem Girl (uncredited)
 Playgirl (1954) - Pam
 Drums Across the River (1954) - Sue
 Francis Joins the WACS (1954) - Kate
 Dawn at Socorro (1954) - Letty Diamond
 So This Is Paris (1954) - Yvonne
 Man Without a Star (1955) - Moccasin Mary
 The Man from Bitter Ridge (1955) - Holly Kenton
 Tarantula (1955) - Stephanie 'Steve' Clayton
 Foxfire (1955) - Maria - Hugh Slater's Nurse
 Raw Edge (1956) - Paca
 A Day of Fury (1956) - Sharman Fulton
 Naked Gun (1956) - Louisa Jackson / Morales
 The Quiet Gun (1957) - Irene
 The Giant Claw (1957) - Sally Caldwell
 Undersea Girl (1957) - Valerie Hudson
 The Black Scorpion (1957) - Teresa Alvarez
 Girls on the Loose (1958) - Vera Parkinson
 The Restless Gun (1959) Episode "Shadow of a Gunfighter"
 The Gauntlet (1977) - Jail Matron
 Sudden Impact (1983) - Loretta - Coffee Shop Waitress
 Pink Cadillac (1989) - Stick Lady
 The Rookie (1990) - Interrogator #2 (final film role)

See also
 List of people in Playboy 1953–1959

References

External links
 
 
 
 

1930 births
Actresses from Santa Monica, California
Female models from California
American film actresses
American television actresses
Living people
1950s Playboy Playmates
20th-century American actresses
21st-century American women